Gino Lawless (born 14 January 1959) was an Irish soccer player during the 1970s, 1980s and 1990s.

He represented Bohemians and Dundalk with great success during his career. Gino made his debut for Bohs on 10 September 1978 after signing from Cambridge Boys. After trialling with Manchester United in the summer of 1979 Lawless was offered terms 

He is most famous for scoring the winner during the 3-2 win over Rangers in the UEFA Cup in September 1984. Was awarded the Player of the Month for his European exploits .

After 310 appearances in all competitions for Bohs, Gino signed for Dundalk in 1986.  He won 2 League of Ireland titles and an FAI Cup winners medal while at Oriel Park and played his last game for them during the 1993/94 season.

Earned two caps for the Republic of Ireland U21 side.

Honours
League of Ireland: 2
 Dundalk - 1987/88, 1990/91
FAI Cup: 1
 Dundalk - 1988
League of Ireland Cup: 3
 Bohemians - 1978/79
 Dundalk - 1986/87, 1989/90

References 

Republic of Ireland association footballers
Association football midfielders
League of Ireland players
League of Ireland XI players
Bohemian F.C. players
Dundalk F.C. players
Athlone Town A.F.C. players
Republic of Ireland under-21 international footballers
Living people
1959 births